Cardiff State Beach is a protected beach in the state park system of California, United States, located near San Diego.  Popular activities include swimming, surfing, and beachcombing.
Just next to Cardiff State Beach is a San Elijo State Beach, which has a state-run campground.  The  park was established in 1949.

See also
List of beaches in California
List of California state parks
California State Beaches

References

External links 
Cardiff State Beach

1949 establishments in California
Beaches of Southern California
California State Beaches
Parks in San Diego County, California
Protected areas established in 1949
Beaches of San Diego County, California